Luan Zheng (born 1984) is a Chinese team handball player. She plays on the Chinese national team, and participated at the 2011 World Women's Handball Championship in Brazil.

References

1984 births
Living people
Chinese female handball players
Asian Games medalists in handball
Handball players at the 2006 Asian Games
Handball players at the 2010 Asian Games
Asian Games gold medalists for China
Medalists at the 2010 Asian Games